Arnold Webster Bunch Jr. (born April 8, 1962) is a retired United States Air Force four-star general. He last served as the commander of Air Force Materiel Command, headquartered at Wright-Patterson Air Force Base, Ohio. He is responsible for installation and mission support, discovery and development, test and evaluation, life cycle management services and sustainment of virtually every major Air Force weapon system. The command employs approximately 80,000 people and manages $60 billion of budget authority annually. Before his current assignment, he was the military deputy in the Office of the Assistant Secretary of the Air Force for Acquisition at The Pentagon.

After retirement from active duty on August 1, 2022, Bunch is scheduled to assume office as director of the Hamblen County school system.

Military career
Born in Tennessee, Bunch was commissioned upon graduating from the United States Air Force Academy in 1984.

Upon completion of Undergraduate Pilot Training in 1985, Bunch completed operational assignments as an instructor, evaluator and aircraft commander for Boeing B-52 Stratofortress. He graduated from the United States Air Force Test Pilot School in 1991. He then conducted developmental testing in the Northrop Grumman B-2 Spirit and B-52, and served as an instructor in each. Additionally, he has commanded at the squadron, group and wing levels and was the commander of the Air Force Test Center, Edwards Air Force Base, California.

In December 2018, Bunch was nominated by President Donald Trump for promotion to general to assume command of the Air Force Materiel Command, but his nomination was later returned by the Senate without a vote in January 2019. The nomination was resubmitted in April 2019. The Armed Services Committee confirmed Bunch for a fourth star and the post of Commander of Air Force Materiel Command on May 23, and Bunch took over command eight days later.

Education
1984 Bachelor of Science in civil engineering, U.S. Air Force Academy, Colorado Springs, Colorado
1991 Squadron Officer School, Maxwell Air Force Base, Alabama
1994 Master of Science in mechanical engineering, California State University, Fresno
1996 Army Command and General Staff College, Fort Leavenworth, Kansas
2000 Master of Science in national security strategy, National War College, Fort Lesley J. McNair, Washington, D.C.

Assignments
 July 1984 – July 1985, student, Undergraduate Pilot Training, Columbus Air Force Base, Mississippi
 August 1985 – December 1985, student, B-52 Combat Crew Training School, Castle AFB, California
 January 1986 – June 1990, standardization and evaluation instructor aircraft commander of 325th Bomb Squadron, Fairchild AFB, Washington
 July 1990 – June 1991, student, U.S. Air Force Test Pilot School, Edwards AFB, California
 July 1991 – June 1992, test pilot, 6512th Test Squadron, Edwards AFB, California
 July 1992 – June 1995, test pilot, 420th Test Squadron, Edwards AFB, California
 June 1995 – June 1996, student, Army Command and General Staff College, Fort Leavenworth, Kansas
 July 1996 – July 1999, chief of B-1 Test and Evaluation, B-1 System Program Office, Wright-Patterson AFB, Ohio
 August 1999 – June 2000, student, National War College, Fort Lesley J. McNair, Washington, D.C.
 June 2000 – July 2002, commander of 419th Flight Test Squadron, Edwards AFB, California
 August 2002 – April 2003, chief of Senior Officer Management, Air Force Materiel Command, Wright-Patterson AFB, Ohio
 April 2003 – June 2004, deputy chief of Combat Forces Division, the Pentagon, Arlington, Virginia
 June 2004 – January 2006, director of Munitions Directorate, Air Force Research Laboratory, Eglin AFB, Florida
 January 2006 – May 2008, commander of 412th Test Wing, Edwards AFB, California
 June 2008 – March 2010, vice commander of Air Armament Center, Eglin AFB, Florida
 March 2010 – June 2011, director and program executive officer for the Fighters and Bombers Directorate, Aeronautical Systems Center, Wright-Patterson AFB, Ohio
 June 2011 – June 2012, commander of Air Force Security Assistance Center, AFMC, Wright-Patterson AFB, Ohio
 June 2012 – June 2015, commander of Air Force Test Center, Edwards AFB, California
 June 2015 – May 2019, military deputy, Office of the Assistant Secretary of the Air Force for Acquisition, the Pentagon, Arlington, Virginia
 May 2019 – June 2022, commander of Air Force Materiel Command, Wright-Patterson AFB, Ohio

Flight information
 Rating: Command pilot
 Hours flown: More than 2,500
 Aircraft flown: B-52, B-2, KC-135, F-16, T-38 and others

Awards and decorations
His major awards and decorations include:

General Arnold W. Bunch, Jr., Air Force Materiel Command Commander is presented with his personal sword during his Order of the Sword ceremony May 13, 2022 at the National Museum of the United States Air Force.

Effective dates of promotion

References

External links

1962 births
Living people
People from Morristown, Tennessee
United States Air Force Academy alumni
United States Air Force generals
Recipients of the Air Force Distinguished Service Medal
Recipients of the Legion of Merit